Tamsola is a monotypic moth genus of the family Erebidae. Its only species, Tamsola tarda, is found in the Kurdistan area of northern Iraq. Both the genus and the species were first described by Edward Parr Wiltshire, the genus in 1949 and the species in 1946.

References

Hypeninae
Monotypic moth genera